The manufacturing readiness level (MRL) is a measure to assess the maturity of manufacturing readiness, similar to how technology readiness levels (TRL) are used for technology readiness. They can be used in general industry assessments, or for more specific application in assessing capabilities of possible suppliers. 

The Government Accountability Office (GAO) has described it as best practice for improving acquisition outcomes. It was developed by the United States Department of Defense (DOD), who adopted the usage of MRLs in 2005. However, GAO continued to note inconsistent application across DOD components. In 2011, consideration of manufacturing readiness and related processes of potential contractors and subcontractors was made mandatory as part of the source selection process in major acquisition programs.

MRLs are quantitative measures used to assess the maturity of a given technology, component or system from a manufacturing perspective. They are used to provide decision makers at all levels with a common understanding of the relative maturity and attendant risks associated with manufacturing technologies, products, and processes being considered. Manufacturing risk identification and management must begin at the earliest stages of technology development, and continue vigorously throughout each stage of a program’s life-cycles. 

Manufacturing readiness level definitions were developed by a joint DOD/industry working group under the sponsorship of the Joint Defense Manufacturing Technology Panel (JDMTP). The intent was to create a measurement scale that would serve the same purpose for manufacturing readiness as Technology Readiness Levels serve for technology readiness – to provide a common metric and vocabulary for assessing and discussing manufacturing maturity, risk and readiness. MRLs were designed with a numbering system to be roughly congruent with comparable levels of TRLs for synergy and ease of understanding and use.

Why manufacturing readiness?

Manufacturing risk identification and management must begin at the earliest stages of technology development, and continue vigorously throughout each stage of a program’s life-cycle.
Matters of manufacturing readiness and producibility are as important to the successful development of a system as those of readiness and capabilities of the technologies intended for the system.

MRLs are assessed to:

 define the current level of manufacturing maturity
 identify maturity shortfalls and associated costs and risks
 provide the basis for manufacturing maturation and risk management

Immature manufacturing processes may lead to the following problems: 

 Inattention to manufacturing during planning and design
 Poor supplier management planning
 Lack of workforce knowledge and skills

Assessing technology readiness levels does leave some major transition questions unanswered: 

 Is the level of performance reproducible?
 What will these cost in production?
 Can these be made in a production environment by someone without a PhD?
 Are suppliers monitored and evaluated?
 Are key materials and components available?
 Are the limits for production scalability identified?

Manufacturing readiness assessments (MRAs) address these unanswered questions in order to reduce manufacturing risk. However, it still does not address the question of whether the product is reliable or maintainable.

Definitions

The following has been adopted by the DOD as appropriate in assessing manufacturing readiness levels:

Dimensions in Assessing Readiness

MRLs are assessed in multiple dimensions (referred to as "threads" within DOD):

 Technology and industrial base
 Industrial base
 Manufacturing technology development
 Design
 Producibility program
 Design maturity
 Cost and funding
 Production cost knowledge (cost modeling)
 Cost analysis
 Manufacturing investment budget
 Materials
 Maturity
 Availability
 Supply chain management
 Special handling
 Process capability and control
 Modeling and simulation of production and process
 Manufacturing process maturity
 Process yields and rates
 Quality management, including supplier quality
 Process Excellence
 Quality tools - Six Sigma, 5S, Lean, Kaizen, APQP, etc.
 Manufacturing workforce (engineering and production)
 Safety training and requirements
 Tools handling and procedures
 Procedure training and levels
 Capacity planning (full time versus part-time)
 Facilities
 Tooling, special test equipment, special inspection equipment
 Facilities
 Manufacturing management
 Manufacturing planning and scheduling
 Materials planning

Examples

Several traditional non-proprietary non-confidential examples are described below illustrating the use of MRL methodology in joining manufacturing.
 3D-Printing and Additive Manufacturing Example
 Aeropace Airframe Body Construction Manufacturing Example
 Automotive Heads and Blocks Casting Manufacturing Example
 Ultra-fine Grain Titanium Billet Manufacturing Example
 Space Shuttle External Tank Friction Stir Welding Example

References

Manufacturing